The 2017–18 Rutgers Scarlet Knights women's basketball team represents Rutgers University during the 2017–18 NCAA Division I women's basketball season. The Scarlet Knights, led by 23rd year head coach C. Vivian Stringer, play their home games at the Louis Brown Athletic Center, better known as The RAC, as a member of the Big Ten Conference.

Despite improving on the dismal 2016–17 season and finishing with a 20–12 record, the Scarlet Knights weren't selected to participate in the 2018 NCAA tournament. They were then offered an at-large berth in the WNIT, but Coach Stringer declined, stating the team needed to "focus on the future" in order to "control our destiny" next season.

Roster

Schedule

|-
! colspan="9" style="background:#CC0000; color:#FFFFFF;"| Non-conference regular season

|-

|-

|-

|-

|-

|-

|-

|-

|-

|-

|-

|-

|-

|-
! colspan="9" style="background:#CC0000; color:#FFFFFF;"| Big Ten conference season

|-

|-

|-

|-

|-

|-

|-

|-

|-

|-

|-

|-

|-

|-

|-

|-
! colspan="9" style="background:#CC0000; color:#FFFFFF;"| Big Ten Women's Tournament

Rankings

See also
2017–18 Rutgers Scarlet Knights men's basketball team

References

Rutgers Scarlet Knights women's basketball seasons
Rutgers
Rutgers
Rutgers